Cristian González full name Cristian Mario González Aidinovich (born December 19, 1976) is an Uruguayan retired football player.

External links
 Profile and statistics of Cristian Gonzalez on One.co.il 
 Profile at tenfieldigital 
 
 

1976 births
Living people
Uruguayan footballers
Uruguay international footballers
Uruguayan Primera División players
Segunda División players
Israeli Premier League players
Liverpool F.C. (Montevideo) players
Defensor Sporting players
Peñarol players
UD Las Palmas players
Maccabi Tel Aviv F.C. players
F.C. Ashdod players
Club Atlético River Plate (Montevideo) players
Beitar Jerusalem F.C. players
Club Plaza Colonia de Deportes players
Deportivo Maldonado players
El Tanque Sisley players
Sud América players
Uruguayan expatriate footballers
Expatriate footballers in Spain
Expatriate footballers in Israel
Uruguayan expatriate sportspeople in Spain
Uruguayan expatriate sportspeople in Israel
Association football defenders